The Canberra Centenary Column is a sculpture in City Hill, Canberra, Australia. It was built to commemorate the city's centenary, and unveiled on 11 March 2014.

The sculpture is an  stainless steel obelisk on a  granite-dressed concrete base. The top of the base is inlaid with glass tiles and has a steel covering etched with images depicting Canberra's 100-year history. It was designed by local artist Geoff Farquhar-Still. The design was inspired by the "Commencement Column" that was proposed to have been built when Canberra was founded, but was never completed.

Encased in the base is a time capsule containing one hundred objects, both symbolic and mundane. The time capsule is intended to be opened in 100 years, during Canberra's bicentenary. The ACT Heritage Library and the National Film and Sound Archive have catalogues of the capsule's contents, and copies of some of the items.

Notes

References

Tourist attractions in Canberra
Obelisks in Australia
Time capsules
2014 sculptures
2014 establishments in Australia
Granite sculptures
Stainless steel sculptures
Regional centennial anniversaries